The Philadelphia Sports Hall of Fame is a nonprofit organization in Philadelphia, Pennsylvania that was established in May 2002 to honor individuals and groups who are either area natives who became prominent in the field of sports or who became prominent in the field of sports in the region.

The Hall of Fame's address is 2701 Grant Avenue in Philadelphia.

From 2004 to 2010, the organization also presented an annual Pride of Philadelphia Award to a team or individual.

Requirements
Individuals, Teams, Venues, Events, and Organizations are all eligible.  Generally they must have gained national prominence as individuals or venues while attached to the Philadelphia region, or won a championship as a team from the Philadelphia region.  Individuals are eligible for induction five years after retirement from a playing career.  When an individual dies, he or she becomes immediately eligible.

An individual who was not an athlete may be inducted in the following categories: Legacy of Excellence, Lifetime Commitment, Philadelphia Medal.

Inductees

Key

Pride of Philadelphia Award

The Pride of Philadelphia Award is given to teams or individuals who have "represented the Philadelphia area with dignity, determination, and class through athletic achievement."

2004
Smarty Jones, winner, Kentucky Derby / Preakness Stakes
Bernard Hopkins, Undisputed middleweight champion
St. Joseph's Men's Basketball, Atlantic 10 East Division champions

2005
Afleet Alex, winner, Preakness Stakes / Belmont Stakes
Philadelphia Phantoms, Calder Cup AHL champions

2006
Prep Charter Boys' Basketball, PIAA Class AA Basketball Champions
Villanova Men's Basketball, Big East Regular Season co-champions
Ryan Howard, NL MVP

2007
Jimmy Rollins, NL MVP, Gold Glove
Cheltenham High School Girls' Basketball, PIAA AAAA State Champions

2008
2008 Philadelphia Phillies, World Series champions
Philadelphia Soul, Arena Bowl XXII Champions
Mount Saint Joseph Academy Girls Basketball, 2008 PIAA AAA State Champions

2009
Villanova Men's Basketball, 2009 NCAA Final Four
Archbishop Carroll boys' and girls' basketball teams, PIAA AAA State Champions
Miguel Cartagena, 2009 Golden Gloves Champion

2010
Carlos Ruiz, Phillies
Villanova football, FCS National Champions
Mark Herzlich, Boston College linebacker

Roll Call of Champions
The hall of fame's website has a page that honors every Greater Philadelphia team—college and professional—that won the championship in its particular sport.

Hall of Fame Charities
The Foundation formed Hall of Fame Charities in 2004. It supports or has formed partnerships with organizations in the Greater Philadelphia area that promote youth sports, especially at the pre-teen, grade-school level. These organizations include: Richie Ashburn Baseball Foundation, Police Athletic League (PAL) Junior Golf, Arthur Ashe Youth Tennis and Education, Bruce Simon Southampton Summer Basketball Camp, The First Tee of Philadelphia, and Ed Snider Youth Hockey Foundation.

Hall of Fame Charities also has student and community programs.

See also

Pennsylvania Sports Hall of Fame
Philadelphia Sports Writers Association
Sports in Philadelphia

References

External links

2002 establishments in Pennsylvania
All-sports halls of fame
Culture of Philadelphia
Halls of fame in Pennsylvania
Non-profit organizations based in Philadelphia
Organizations established in 2002
Awards established in 2004
Sports in Pennsylvania
Sports in Philadelphia
Sports museums in Pennsylvania